Scott Icefalls is an extensive icefalls near the head of Mill Glacier, between Otway Massif and the south part of Dominion Range. Named by the New Zealand Geological Survey Antarctic Expedition (NZGSAE) (1961–62) for Captain Robert F. Scott.

Icefalls of the Ross Dependency
Dufek Coast